The 2017 Ligue 1 is the 50th season of Ligue 1, the top professional league for association football clubs in the Republic of the Congo, since its establishment in 1961. The season started on 21 January 2017 and concluded on 24 September 2017.

Standings

References

2017 in the Republic of the Congo sport
Football competitions in the Republic of the Congo
Congo Republic